Circus is the sixth studio album of Argent, released in March 1975 by Epic (PE 33422), and distributed by CBS. It was the last album as part of their contract with CBS Records and the first after the departure of founding member/lead vocalist/guitarist Russ Ballard. New lead vocalist John Verity was added at the recommendation of Ballard (Verity's band had supported Argent during their previous tour and had impressed Ballard).

The album was recorded during an intense session after the new line up of the band workshopped and practised the material written largely by Rod Argent (bassist Jim Rodford wrote "Trapeze"). Prior to this album Argent had been working with his songwriting collaborator Chris White (the duo had written songs together and separately in The Zombies) on material for the band. The band quickly followed up with a second album Counterpoints the same year (1975) for RCA Records which has yet to be officially released on CD or in digital form.

The album is a concept album using the circus as a metaphor for life. The album charted at 171 in Billboard. Circus received a CD release as an individual title and a two-album on one CD release from Wounded Bird Records in 2005.

Track listing 
All songs composed by Rod Argent except where indicated.

Personnel 

Argent
 Rod Argent – Fender Rhodes electric piano, acoustic piano, Mellotron, Moog synthesizer, Hammond organ, vocals
 John Verity – guitar, vocals
 John Grimaldi – guitar, cover art
 Jim Rodford – bass, vocals
 Robert Henrit – drums, percussion
Technical 
 Mike Ross-Trevor – engineer
 Mark Williams – second engineer
 Martin Springett - inner sleeve illustration

References 

1975 albums
Argent (band) albums
Albums produced by Rod Argent
Albums produced by Chris White (musician)
Epic Records albums